Ring frei is the fourth studio album recorded by German singer LaFee. It was released as her third album in German on 2 January 2009.

Track listing

Charts

References

External links
Official LaFee website

2009 albums
LaFee albums
German-language albums